Agassiziella hapilista is a moth in the family Crambidae first described by Charles Swinhoe in 1892. It is found in India, where it has been recorded from the Khasi Hills. It is also present in Taiwan.

References

Acentropinae
Moths of Asia
Moths of Taiwan
Moths described in 1892